Facundo Julián Callejo (born 2 July 1992) is an Argentine professional footballer who plays as a forward for Primera B Nacional side Temperley.

Career
Callejo had youth spells with Santamarina and Colón, he made the step into first-team football with Colón where he scored two goals in fifteen matches for them between 2013 and 2017; his debut came on 27 April 2013 in an Argentine Primera División win at home to Arsenal de Sarandí. During his time with Colón, Callejo spent time out on loan on four occasions. In January 2014, Callejo joined Gimnasia y Esgrima in Primera B Nacional. He played twenty-one times with the club and scored nine goals, including the first of his professional career in March versus Villa San Carlos.

After returning to Colón in June 2014, Callejo joined Liga de Loja of the Ecuadorian Serie A in January 2015. He scored on his Liga de Loja debut on 31 January, scoring in a 1–1 vs. Barcelona. Four more goals in a total of seventeen games followed. 2016 saw Callejo join Argentine Primera División side Patronato on a temporary basis, but he returned to Colón at the start of 2016–17 after only two matches. For the rest of 2016–17, Callejo signed for Santamarina of Primera B Nacional. He played twenty-five games and netted two goals vs. Independiente Rivadavia and Juventud Unida respectively.

On 16 January 2018, Callejo joined Venezuelan Primera División side Carabobo on a contract until December 2018. However, six months later, following one goal in eight Carabobo appearances, Callejo returned to Argentina to rejoin former loan club Gimnasia y Esgrima.

Career statistics
.

References

External links

1992 births
Living people
People from Tandil
Argentine footballers
Association football forwards
Argentine expatriate footballers
Expatriate footballers in Ecuador
Expatriate footballers in Venezuela
Expatriate footballers in Greece
Argentine expatriate sportspeople in Ecuador
Argentine expatriate sportspeople in Venezuela
Argentine expatriate sportspeople in Greece
Argentine Primera División players
Primera Nacional players
Ecuadorian Serie A players
Venezuelan Primera División players
Club Atlético Colón footballers
Gimnasia y Esgrima de Jujuy footballers
L.D.U. Loja footballers
Club Atlético Patronato footballers
Club y Biblioteca Ramón Santamarina footballers
Carabobo F.C. players
All Boys footballers
Club Atlético Temperley footballers
Sportspeople from Buenos Aires Province